Aderbasib (codenamed INCB7839) is a sheddase inhibitor that may suppress tumor cell proliferation. Acting on multiple receptor classes and subclasses, aderbasib is observed to regulate the tumor necrosis factor of cancer cells.
Aderbasib was being developed by Incyte as a potential adjunctive treatment for metastatic breast cancer. Development was halted in 2011 after positive findings from Phase II trials were contradicted by further research.

References

External links
NCI Thesaurus

Chemotherapy